The Sonoran woodrat (Neotoma phenax) is a species of rodent in the family Cricetidae found only in Mexico.

References

Sonoran Woodrat
Endemic mammals of Mexico
Near threatened fauna of North America
Taxonomy articles created by Polbot
Taxa named by Clinton Hart Merriam
Fauna of the Sonoran Desert
Sonoran–Sinaloan transition subtropical dry forest
Sinaloan dry forests